Øyslebø is a former municipality that was located in the old Vest-Agder county in Norway. The  municipality existed from 1899 until its dissolution in 1964. The administrative centre was the village of Øyslebø where Øyslebø Church is located. Øyslebø municipality was located in part of the present-day municipality of Lindesnes in Agder county.

History

The municipality of Øyslebø was established on 1 January 1899 when the old municipality of Øyslebø og Laudal was split into two separate municipalities: Laudal and Øyslebø (population: 991). During the 1960s, there were many municipal mergers across Norway due to the work of the Schei Committee. On 1 January 1964, the Brunvatne area of Øyslebø (population: 44) was transferred to the neighboring municipality of Søgne.  Also on that date, the rest of Øyslebø was merged with the neighboring municipalities of Laudal and Bjelland as well as a portion of Finsland to form the new municipality of Marnardal.  Prior to the merger, Øyslebø had a population of 1,068.

Name
The municipality (originally the parish) of Øyslebø is named after the old Øyslebø farm, where Øyslebø Church is located.  The name is derived from the old river name, .  The name was previously spelled Øslebø or Øislebø.

Government
All municipalities in Norway, including Øyslebø, are responsible for primary education (through 10th grade), outpatient health services, senior citizen services, unemployment and other social services, zoning, economic development, and municipal roads.  The municipality was governed by a municipal council of elected representatives, which in turn elected a mayor.

Municipal council
The municipal council  of Øyslebø was made up of representatives that were elected to four year terms.  The party breakdown of the final municipal council was as follows:

See also
List of former municipalities of Norway

References

Lindesnes
Kristiansand
Former municipalities of Norway
1899 establishments in Norway
1964 disestablishments in Norway